Victoria González (born January 12, 1991), better known as Raquel González, is an American professional wrestler. She is currently signed to WWE, where she performs on the SmackDown brand under the ring name Raquel Rodriguez. She is a former NXT Women's Champion, two-time NXT Women's Tag Team Champion and WWE Women's Tag Team Champion.

González is a second generation professional wrestler, following her father Rick González. In 2021, she and Dakota Kai won the inaugural Women's Dusty Rhodes Tag Team Classic and became the inaugural NXT Women's Tag Team Champions, while González won the NXT Women's Championship.

Early life 
Victoria González was born on January 12, 1991, in La Feria, Texas, United States. She is of Mexican descent. A fan of professional wrestling growing up, she cited Madusa and Lita as her inspirations, as well as her father Rick, who was also a wrestler. Through high school and college, González was a basketball player, playing collegiately for the Texas A&M–Kingsville Javelinas. In 2013, she transferred to Sam Houston State University where she continued her collegiate basketball career, and earned her bachelor's degree in Mass Communication.

Professional wrestling career

WWE

Early appearances (2016–2018) 
On October 25, 2016, it was reported that González had signed with WWE and reported to the WWE Performance Center. She made her in-ring debut on January 20, 2017, under her birth name at an NXT live event, where she was unsuccessful winning a 12-woman battle royal. On the May 3 episode of NXT, González made her first television appearance in a losing effort, where she was eliminated during a battle royal to determine the #1 contender for the NXT Women's Championship. Under the name Reina González, she competed in the inaugural Mae Young Classic tournament, where she was eliminated during the first round by Nicole Savoy, which aired on August 28. González would compete again in the tournament in 2018, where she once again was eliminated in the first round by Kacy Catanzaro.

Alliance with Dakota Kai (2020–2021) 
On February 16, 2020, at NXT TakeOver: Portland, under the ring name Raquel González, she interfered in a street fight between Dakota Kai and Tegan Nox by slamming Nox through a table, allowing Kai to win the match, establishing herself as a heel in the process. González then became Kai's bodyguard, helping her win her matches. González had her first pay-per-view match on June 7 at TakeOver: In Your House, where she, Kai, and Candice LeRae lost to Mia Yim, Nox and Shotzi Blackheart in a six-woman tag team match. Afterwards, González went on a short hiatus, but returned on the August 19 episode of NXT, helping Kai attack NXT Women's Champion Io Shirai. At NXT TakeOver XXX three days later, after Kai lost to Shirai, Rhea Ripley confronted González, beginning a rivalry between the two. González lost to Ripley on October 28 at Halloween Havoc. Kai and González aligned with LeRae and Toni Storm in November, resulting in a WarGames match against Blackheart, Ember Moon, Shirai, and Ripley on December 6 at NXT TakeOver: WarGames, which González won after pinning Shirai. At New Year's Evil on January 6, 2021, she defeated Ripley in a Last Woman Standing match, ending their feud.

Kai and González took part in the inaugural Women's Dusty Rhodes Tag Team Classic, defeating Aliyah and Jessi Kamea in the first round, Kacy Catanzaro and Kayden Carter in the semi-finals, and Moon and Blackheart at Vengeance Day on February 14 to win the tournament. As a result of their win, they received a match for the WWE Women's Tag Team Championship against champions Nia Jax and Shayna Baszler on March 3; the match ended in controversy, with Jax and Baszler retaining after Baszler submitted Kai despite her not being tagged in. As a result, González and Kai were crowned the inaugural NXT Women's Tag Team Champions the following week, the first title in González's career; however, they would lose the titles 56 minutes later to Blackheart and Moon in their first title defense.

NXT Women's Champion (2021–2022) 
On April 7, 2021, at the first night of NXT TakeOver: Stand & Deliver, González defeated Shirai to become the new NXT Women's Champion. On the May 11 episode of NXT, she made her first successful title defense against Mercedes Martinez. On June 13 at NXT TakeOver: In Your House, González retained the title against Ember Moon. On the July 27 episode of NXT, González was attacked by Kai, turning face for the first time in her career and ending their alliance. This led to a title match between the two at NXT TakeOver 36 on August 22, where González retained and was confronted by Kay Lee Ray. 

On the September 28 episode of NXT, after retaining the title against Franky Monet, she was attacked by Toxic Attraction (Mandy Rose, Gigi Dolin, and Jacy Jayne). The following week, a Spin the Wheel, Make the Deal match between González and Rose for the title was made for Halloween Havoc on October 26, where she lost the NXT Women's Championship to Rose in a Trick or Street Fight due to the returning Kai's interference, ending her reign at 202 days. On December 5 at WarGames, González, Cora Jade, Io Shirai and Kay Lee Ray defeated Kai and Toxic Attraction in a WarGames match. At New Year's Evil on January 4, 2022, González failed to regain the title in a triple threat match also involving Jade, who Rose pinned to retain the title. González and Jade then took part in the Women's Dusty Rhodes Tag Team Classic, defeating Valentina Feroz & Yulisa Leon in the first round, but lost to Kai and Wendy Choo in the semi-finals on March 8 at Roadblock.

On the March 29 episode of NXT, after Toxic Attraction took out Choo, Dakota Kai attacked the group and was assisted by a returning González, whom Kai embraced afterwards. It was then announced that Kai and González would face Toxic Attraction members Gigi Dolin and Jacy Jayne for the NXT Women's Tag Team Championship during the pre-show of NXT Stand & Deliver on April 2, in which they were successful in winning the titles. Their first title defense was scheduled for the following episode of NXT, where they lost the titles back to Toxic Attraction due to Mandy Rose's interference; this was González's final appearance in NXT.

Main roster (2022–present) 
On the April 8 episode of SmackDown, González made her main roster debut in a backstage segment under the new ring name Raquel Rodriguez. On the April 29 episode of SmackDown, she made her in-ring debut for the brand, defeating local competitor Cat Cardoza. On the May 13 episode of SmackDown, Rodriguez answered Ronda Rousey's open challenge for the SmackDown Women's Championship, but lost. On the June 17 episode of SmackDown, Rodriguez defeated Shayna Baszler to qualify for the Money in the Bank ladder match on July 2, which was won by Liv Morgan. On the August 5 episode of SmackDown, Rodriguez competed in a gauntlet match to determine the number one contender to Morgan's SmackDown Women's Championship, but was the last woman eliminated by Baszler. The following week, she and Aliyah participated in the WWE Women's Tag Team Championship Tournament, defeating Shotzi and Xia Li in the first round, and Natalya and Sonya Deville in the semi-finals. On the August 29 episode of Raw, Rodriguez and Aliyah defeated Damage CTRL (Dakota Kai and Iyo Sky) in the finals to win the vacant tag titles, making her the first woman to have held the NXT Women's, NXT and WWE Women's Tag Team Championships. On the September 12 episode of Raw, they lost the titles to Kai and Sky, ending their reign at 14 days. After Shotzi saved Rodriguez from an attack by Damage CTRL, they challenged Kai and Sky for the titles on the October 21 episode of SmackDown, but were unsuccessful after Bayley distracted Shotzi. On the November 11 episode of SmackDown, Rodriguez competed in a six-pack challenge to determine the #1 contender to Rousey's SmackDown Women's Championship, which was won by Shotzi. On the December 23 episode of SmackDown, Rodriguez won a gauntlet match to become the number one contender to Ronda Rousey's SmackDown Women's Championship. The following week on SmackDown, Rodriguez failed to win the title after interference from Shayna Baszler.

Rodriguez entered her first Royal Rumble match at the titular event on January 28, 2023. She entered at #22 and eliminated Nia Jax, Lacey Evans, and Piper Niven before being eliminated by eventual winner Rhea Ripley.

Professional wrestling style 
During her time in NXT, she performed a one-arm powerbomb as a finishing move called the Chingona Bomb. The move was renamed to the Tejana Bomb when she was drafted to the main roster since it was deemed too vulgar.

Personal life 
Gonzalez is currently in a relationship with fellow WWE Superstar, Adam Scherr, better known by his ring name Braun Strowman.

Championships and accomplishments 

 Pro Wrestling Illustrated
 Ranked No. 10 of the top 150 female wrestlers in the PWI Women's 150 in 2021
 WWE
 WWE Women's Tag Team Championship (1 time) - with Aliyah
 NXT Women's Championship (1 time)
 NXT Women's Tag Team Championship (2 times, inaugural) – with Dakota Kai
 WWE Women's Tag Team Championship Tournament (2022) – with Aliyah  
 Women's Dusty Rhodes Tag Team Classic (2021) – with Dakota Kai
Other titles
National Don’t H8 Ringmaster (2021)

References

External links
 
 
 
 

1991 births
American people of Mexican descent
American professional wrestlers of Mexican descent
American female professional wrestlers
American actresses of Mexican descent
Living people
Professional wrestlers from Texas
Texas A&M–Kingsville Javelinas athletes
NXT Women's Tag Team Champions
NXT Women's Champions
People from La Feria, Texas
21st-century American women
21st-century professional wrestlers
WWE Women's Tag Team Champions